A general election was held in the U.S. state of Wyoming on Tuesday, November 7, 1950. All of the state's executive officers—the governor, secretary of state, auditor, treasurer, and superintendent of public instruction—were up for election. The Republican Party swept all of the offices. Following Democratic governor Lester C. Hunt's election to the U.S. Senate in 1948, Republican secretary of state Arthur G. Crane had been acting as governor. Republican Congressman Frank A. Barrett was elected governor, and Republican candidates won the other statewide races.

Governor

Following Governor Lester C. Hunt's election to the U.S. Senate in 1948, Republican secretary of state Arthur G. Crane had been acting as governor. Crane declined to seek re-election, and Congressman Frank A. Barrett, the Republican nominee, defeated his congressional predecessor, John J. McIntyre, the Democratic nominee, for the Republican Party's first gubernatorial victory since 1938.

Secretary of state
Incumbent Republican secretary of state Arthur G. Crane had acted as governor starting in 1949, when Governor Hunt was sworn into the U.S. Senate. Crane declined to run for re-election in 1950. Accordingly, term-limited Republican state treasurer Doc Rogers ran to succeed him. He defeated State Senator Richard Luman in the Republican primary, and then faced Cheyenne mayor Ben Nelson, the Democratic nominee, in the general election. Despite the strong Republican performance across the state, Rogers only narrowly defeated Nelson. Ironically, just as Crane had acted as governor when Hunt was elected to the Senate, Governor Barrett would similarly be elected to the Senate in 1952, elevating Rogers to the governorship.

Democratic primary

Candidates
 Ben Nelson, Mayor of Cheyenne

Results

Republican primary

Candidates
 Doc Rogers, Wyoming State Treasurer
 Richard J. "Dick" Luman, former state senator

Results

General election

Results

Auditor
Incumbent Republican state auditor Everett T. Copenhaver ran for re-election to a second term. He was challenged in the Republican primary by Sam Morgan, a state bank examiner, whom he handily defeated. Democrats did not seriously recruit a candidate to challenge Copenhaver, and political newcomer Robert Holland emerged as the nominee over attorney Leonard Schlather. Copenhaver easily defeated Holland, winning the largest margin of victory of any statewide candidate that year.

Democratic primary

Candidates
 Robert W. Holland, political newcomer
 Leonard H. "Judge" Schlather, attorney, 1948 Democratic candidate for the State House

Results

Republican primary

Candidates
 Everett T. Copenhaver, incumbent state auditor
 Sam B. Morgan, senior bank examiner in State Examiner's office

Results

General election

Results

Treasurer
Incumbent Republican state treasurer Doc Rogers, unable to seek re-election, instead ran for secretary of state. A competitive Republican primary formed to replace him. State Representative J. Roy Mitchell ran against State Senate President George Burke and former state representative Paul Groesbeck. Like the 1946 primary, the final result was close, with Mitchell beating Burke by fewer than 500 votes. In the general election, Mitchell faced State Representative Raymond B. Morris. Mitchell decisively defeated Morris, winning 56% of the vote to Morris's 44%. However, a little more than a year into his term, Morris died from a heart attack and his wife, Minnie Mitchell, was appointed as his replacement by Governor Barrett. She subsequently won a special election in 1952 for the balance of her husband's term.

Democratic primary

Candidates
 Raymond B. Morris, state representative from Laramie County, 1942 Democratic candidate for secretary of state

Results

Republican primary

Candidates
 J. Roy Mitchell, state representative from Natrona County
 George Burke, president of the Wyoming Senate
 Paul W. Groesbeck, former state representative from Laramie County

Results

General election

Results

Superintendent of public instruction
Incumbent Republican superintendent of public instruction Edna B. Stolt ran for re-election to a second term. She faced challenges in the Republican primary from Verda James, who had served under Stolt as deputy superintendent, and from Henry L. Rebbe, Jr., who served as superintendent of schools for the town of Glenrock. Though Stolt won renomination, she was unable to win a majority of the vote, winning just 49.5% of the vote to James's 35% and Rebbe's 15.5%. In the general election, she faced the Democratic nominee, Glenn K. Rogers, a high school teacher in Cheyenne. Despite her weak performance in the Republican primary, Stolt overwhelmingly defeated Rogers in the general election, improving on her performance from 1946.

Democratic primary

Candidates
 Glenn K. Rogers, Cheyenne high school teacher

Results

Republican primary

Candidates
 Edna B. Stolt, incumbent superintendent of public instruction
 Verda James, former deputy superintendent of public instruction
 Henry L. Rebbe, Jr., former Glenrock superintendent of schools

Results

General election

Results

References

 
Wyoming